The Scindia School is an Indian boarding school for boys, established in 1897, and situated in the historic Gwalior Fort, in the city of Gwalior. It was originally started exclusively for royals and nobles of Indian princely states, particularly the Marathas, though it no longer discriminates on class. In 2010, the school enrolled 606 students, with a teacher:student ratio of 1:12.

History

The Scindia School was founded by the late Maharaja Madho Rao Scindia of Gwalior in 1897, as the Sardar School. It was meant exclusively for sons of Indian royalty and nobility. It was renamed, "The Scindia School", in 1933, as it evolved into a public school with a Board of Governors, presently headed by Jyotiraditya Scindia, scion of Scindia family.

It was in the city of Gwalior and was shifted to the Gwalior Fort around the turn of the century. The Scindia School eventually became a public residential school for boys under the headmastership of F G Pearce. The school celebrated its centenary in October 1997. Scindia School was ranked as the best boys boarding school in India 2020 according to the Education World Magazine.

Student life

The school has classes from grade 6th to 12th.

Housing 

The school is in the erstwhile barracks of British soldiers and the teachers live in the residential quarters once occupied by the British officials.

The school is divided into twelve houses, four for juniors and eight for seniors, each named after places and individuals from Maratha history. Junior houses are Jankoji, Dattaji (Sarvapalli), Nimaji and Kanerkhed (Siddharth). Senior houses are Jayaji, Ranoji, Mahadji, Jeevaji, Madhav, Shivaji, Daulat (Vivekanand) and Jayappa (Chaitanya) (Jyotiba house was discontinued in 2003).

The four houses for the junior boys are looked after by housemistresses, matrons and other domestic staff. The senior houses have a housemaster and a resident tutor along with the domestic staff. The housemaster's residence and that of another faculty member are attached to each house to ensure the availability of pastoral guidance.

Activities
Extracurricular activities are organised by students and supervised by faculty. The school has Junior and Senior Debating Society teams and two literary societies — one for English and one for Sanskrit and Hindi. The students run societies to cater to interests in history, geography, mathematics, science, and ICT. 

Students take up hobbies like music, photography, painting, glass painting, batik dying, papier-mâché, clay modelling, pottery, stone carving, wood work and metal work. Students participate in educational camps, nature camps, adventure activities — outdoor survival, mountaineering expeditions, white water rafting, skiing and cycling.

Sports
Students participate in sports including track & field athletics, soccer, hockey, cricket, basketball, skating, horse riding, archery, rifle shooting, boxing, equestrian, squash, tennis, badminton, swimming and deep-pool diving and more. A large multi-purpose gym serves the students in their indoor sporting pursuits.

Notable alumni 
Notable alumni of the school include people from the armed forces, politics, academics, including Gp Capt Amit Sinha, Raj Zutshi, Anurag Kashyap, Salman Khan,

See also 

 Scindia Kanya Vidyalaya
 Daly College
 Mayo College
 Rajkumar College, Rajkot
 Gwalior State
 Indore State
 Dewas Junior
 Dewas Senior
 Dhar State

References

External links 

 
The Scindia Old Boys Association
The Common Room - Scindia Old Boys

Round Square schools
Boys' schools in India
High schools and secondary schools in Madhya Pradesh
Boarding schools in Madhya Pradesh
Schools in Gwalior
Educational institutions established in 1897
1897 establishments in India